Qallin is a city in the Kafr El Sheikh Governorate, Egypt.

See also

 List of cities and towns in Egypt

References 

Populated places in Kafr El Sheikh Governorate